Effrinagh (in ) is a townland in County Leitrim. Effrinagh is a place about five miles east of Carrick on Shannon. It remains a quiet place in spite of its proximity to the bustle and hustle of Carrick. It is dotted with lakes and traversed by boreens (from the Irish bóithrín, meaning a small road). James Gralton came from Effrinagh, where he built his Pearse-Connolly Hall before he was deported to New York City.

References

Townlands of County Leitrim